The Show Down is a 1917 American silent drama film directed by Lynn Reynolds and starring Myrtle Gonzalez, George Hernandez and Arthur Hoyt.

Cast
 Myrtle Gonzalez as Lydia Benson
 George Hernandez as John Benson
 Arthur Hoyt as Oliver North
 George Chesebro as Robert Curtis
 Edward Cecil as Langdon Curtis
 Jean Hersholt as Parkes

References

Bibliography
 Paul C. Spehr & Gunnar Lundquist. American Film Personnel and Company Credits, 1908-1920. McFarland, 1996.

External links
 

1917 films
1917 drama films
1910s English-language films
American silent feature films
Silent American drama films
American black-and-white films
Universal Pictures films
Films directed by Lynn Reynolds
1910s American films
English-language drama films